Sueño, el sueño or sueños may refer to:

Film and TV
 Sueño (film), 2005 English-language American comedy film
 Sueños (2003 film), a short film featuring Adam Jezierski 
 Sueños (TV series), a 1999 telenovela featuring Guillermo Dávila

Music
Sueños (Intocable album), 2002 Tejano album
Sueños (Los Yonic's album), 2003 pop album
Sueños (Sech album), 2019 album
Sueños (Yolandita Monge album), 1983 Latin pop album
 Sueño, a 1989 album by Eddie Palmieri
"Sueño", a 1967 song by the Young Rascals from their album Groovin'

See also
 
 Dream (disambiguation)